The second VIP series of La Venganza de los Ex will begin airing on 24 Januzry 2023. It is the third series of the show overall. The series was confirmed in December 2022 when it was announced that filming had begun and would feature another full cast of celebrities rather than civilians.

Cast 
The list of cast members was released in January 2023. They include five men; Brandon Meza, Christian Renaud, Isaac Torres, Pedro Luis Figueira known as "La Divaza", Rafael Delgado known as "Rufas" and five women: Ana Cisneros, Diana Estrada, Leslie Gallardo, Lizbeth Rodríguez and Yurgenis Aular.

All the singles joined in the first episode, Andrea Gasca, Isaac's ex, was the first to arrive. In the second episode, Diana's ex Jay Castro came to the beach. During the fourth episode, Andrés Carruyo, Pedro's ex, came to the beach. Later, Michelle Lando arrived at the house as Rafael's ex, who was part of the previous season.

 Bold indicates original cast member; all other cast were brought into the series as an ex.

Duration of cast 

 Key:  = "Cast member" is featured in this episode
 Key:  = "Cast member" arrives on the beach
 Key:  = "Cast member" has an ex arrive on the beach
 Key:  = "Cast member" arrives on the beach and has an ex arrive during the same episode
 Key:  = "Cast member" leaves the beach
 Key:  = "Cast member" does not feature in this episode

Episodes

Notes

References 

MTV original programming
Mexican reality television series
Ex on the Beach
Television shows filmed in Colombia